Harold D. Schuster (August 1, 1902 – July 19, 1986) was an American editor and film director. In 1937, he made Wings of the Morning, the first-ever three-strip Technicolor film shot in Europe.

Among the better-known films that Schuster directed are the 1954 film noir thriller Loophole and the 1957 Western Dragoon Wells Massacre.

Selected filmography

As editor
 Women Everywhere (1930)
 Don't Bet on Women (1931)
 Always Goodbye (1931)
 One More Spring (1935)

As director
 Wings of the Morning (1937)
 Dinner at the Ritz (1937)
 Queer Cargo (1938)
 Swing That Cheer (1938)
 Exposed (1938)
One Hour to Live (1939)
Framed (1940)
 Zanzibar (1940)
 Ma! He's Making Eyes at Me (1940)
 South to Karanga (1940)
 Diamond Frontier (1940)
 A Very Young Lady (1941)
 On the Sunny Side (1942)
 Small Town Deb (1942)
 The Postman Didn't Ring (1942)
 Girl Trouble (1942)
 Bomber's Moon (co-director credited as "Charles Fuhr"; 1943)
 My Friend Flicka (1943)
 Marine Raiders (1944)
 The Mad Hatter (1946)
 The Tender Years (1948)
 So Dear to My Heart (1949) 
 Kid Monk Baroni (1952)
 Jack Slade (1953)
 Loophole (1954)
 Security Risk (1954)
 Port of Hell (1954)
 The Adventures of Ellery Queen (1955) (TV series)
 Tarzan's Hidden Jungle (1955)
 Finger Man (1955)
 Texas Rose (1956)
 Schlitz Playhouse (1956) (TV series)
 Down Liberty Road (1956)
 Zane Grey Theater (1957) (TV series)
 Dragoon Wells Massacre (1957)
 Portland Exposé (1957)
 Courage of Black Beauty (1958)
 The Adventures of McGraw (1958) (TV series)
 The Power of the Resurrection (1958)
 Tombstone Territory (1958) (TV series)
 Lassie (1959) (TV series)
 The Lineup (TV series)
 Man with a Camera (TV series)
 U.S. Marshal (TV series)
 The D.A.'s Man (TV series)
 Death Valley Days (TV series)
 Overland Trail (TV series)
 Surfside 6 (TV series)
 The Legend of Jesse James (TV series)

References

External links

1902 births
1986 deaths
Film directors from Iowa
People from Cherokee, Iowa
American film editors